The Sioux City Air Defense Sector (SCADS) is an inactive United States Air Force organization.  Its last assignment was with the Air Defense Command 29th Air Division,  being stationed at Sioux City Air Force Station, Iowa.

History
SCADS was established in October 1958 assuming control of former ADC Central Air Defense Force units in western Iowa, most of Nebraska along with southern South Dakota.   Also provided air defense over parts of Minnesota, Colorado and Wyoming. The organization provided command and control over several aircraft and radar squadrons.

On 1 December 1961, the new Semi Automatic Ground Environment (SAGE) Direction Center (DC-22) became operational.    DC-22  was equipped with dual AN/FSQ-7 Computers.   The day-to-day operations of the command was to train and maintain tactical flying units flying jet interceptor aircraft (F-94 Starfire; F-102 Delta Dagger; F-106 Delta Dart) in a state of readiness with training missions and series of exercises with SAC and other units simulating interceptions of incoming enemy aircraft.

The Sector was inactivated on 1 April 1966 as part of an ADC consolidation and reorganization; and its units were reassigned to the 30th Air Division.

Lineage
 Established as Sioux City Air Defense Sector on 1 October 1959
 Inactivated on 1 April 1966

Assignments
 20th Air Division, 1 October 1959
 33d Air Division, 1 January 1960
 29th Air Division, 1 July 1961 – 1 April 1966

Stations
 Sioux City Air Force Station, Iowa, 1 October 1959 – 1 April 1966

Components

Wing
 328th Fighter Wing (Air Defense)
 Richards-Gebaur AFB, Missouri, 1 July 1961-1 April 1966

Radar Squadrons

 625th Radar Squadron
 Hastings AFS, Nebraska, 1 January 1962-1 April 1966 
 695th Radar Squadron
 Pickstown AFS, South Dakota, 16 April 1961-1 April 1966
 731st Radar Squadron
 Sundance AFS, Wyoming, 25 June 1963-1 April 1966  
 738th Radar Squadron
 Olathe AFS, Kansas, 1 July 1961-1 April 1966  

 787th Radar Squadron
 Chandler AFS, Minnesota, 4 September 1963-1 April 1966  
 789th Radar Squadron
 Omaha AFS, Nebraska, 1 July 1961-1 April 1966  
 793d Radar Squadron
 Hutchinson AFS, Kansas, 1 July 1961-1 April 1966  
 903d Radar Squadron
 Gettysburg AFS, South Dakota, 4 September 1963-1 April 1966

See also
 List of USAF Aerospace Defense Command General Surveillance Radar Stations
 Aerospace Defense Command Fighter Squadrons

References

  A Handbook of Aerospace Defense Organization 1946 - 1980,  by Lloyd H. Cornett and Mildred W. Johnson, Office of History, Aerospace Defense Center, Peterson Air Force Base, Colorado
 Winkler, David F. (1997), Searching the skies: the legacy of the United States Cold War defense radar program. Prepared for United States Air Force Headquarters Air Combat Command.
 Maurer, Maurer (1983). Air Force Combat Units Of World War II. Maxwell AFB, Alabama: Office of Air Force History. .
 Ravenstein, Charles A. (1984). Air Force Combat Wings Lineage and Honors Histories 1947–1977. Maxwell AFB, Alabama: Office of Air Force History. .
 Radomes.org Sioux City Air Defense Sector

Air Defense
Military units and formations disestablished in 1966
1951 establishments in Iowa
1966 disestablishments in Iowa